Helicoradomenia is a genus of  solenogasters, shell-less, worm-like mollusks. 

Some species in this genus inhabit mid-ocean ridges.

Species
 Helicoradomenia acredema Scheltema, 2000
 Helicoradomenia bisquama Scheltema, 2000
 Helicoradomenia juani Scheltema & Kuzirian, 1991
 Helicoradomenia parathermalis Salvini-Plawen, 2008

References

Cavibelonia